Tom Potts is #109 of the Child Ballads, the collection of 305 ballads from England and Scotland, and their American variants, collected by Francis James Child in the late nineteenth century. The collection was published as The English and Scottish Popular Ballads between 1882 and 1898 by Houghton Mifflin in ten volumes and later reissued in a five volume edition.

Synopsis

The heroine rejects a rich suitor, Lord Fenix/Phenix, for her poor true love, Tom Potts.  Her angry father makes arrangements for the wedding.  She sends word to Tom.  He sends back word that he will be there and goes to his lord, asking for assistance.  The lord is generous with him.  Tom interrupts the wedding procession to challenge the groom.  He wins.  Her father agrees to their marriage and makes Tom his heir.

Motifs
The unequal match is a very common motif in ballads and romances, such as Richie Story and King Cophetua.

References

Child Ballads
Houghton Mifflin books
Year of song unknown
Songwriter unknown